Gary or Gareth Morgan may refer to:

Sportsmen
Gary Morgan (athlete) (born 1960), American Olympic racewalker
Gary Morgan (footballer) (born 1961), English left back
Gareth Morgan (baseball) (born 1996), Canadian outfielder

Writers
Gareth Morgan (business theorist) (born 1943), Welsh-Canadian author of management theory 
Gareth Morgan (economist) (born 1953), New Zealand politician, economist, businessman and philanthropist
Gareth Morgan (editor), English editor in 2003 of tabloid Daily Star Sunday

Others
Gary Morgan, Canadian politician in 1996 Progressive Conservative Party of Prince Edward Island leadership elections#1996 leadership convention
Gary Morgan (actor) (born 1950), American performer and stuntman
Gareth Morgan (South African politician) (born 1977), South African MP
Gareth Morgan (painter) (born 1978), British artist